Set in Stone is the third album by the Australian heavy metal band Lord. It was released in September 2009 by the band's own label Dominus in conjunction with Riot! Entertainment. This was the first Lord album with the guitarist Mark Furtner as an official member (he was listed as a guest on Ascendence) and the last for Tim Yatras, who left after it was recorded but before it was released.

Overview
Set in Stone was recorded at the band's studio in Wollongong, Australia, as was Ascendence. As on that album, the pop singer Tania Moran recorded backing vocals for several songs. The Colombian artist Felipe Machado Franco once again designed the art.

Set in Stone was prefaced in late 2008 by the EP Hear No Evil which contained the album's title track. The Kylie Minogue cover "On a Night Like This" from the EP can be found on Set in Stone as a bonus track. A video was made for the song "New Horizons" with footage from the first leg of their 2009 Australian tour that, according to the band, was filmed with a Nokia N95 mobile phone. The song includes a guest guitar solo by Pete Lesperance of Harem Scarem.

"Be My Guest" is an instrumental track featuring guest solos from Craig Goldy of Dio, Glen Drover from Eidolon, Olof Mörck of Dragonland, Yoshiyasu Maruyama of the Japanese thrash band Argument Soul, Angra's Felipe Andreoli, the former Enter Twilight member Richie Hausberger, Chris Porcianko from Vanishing Point, Chris Brooks and former Dungeon members Stu Marshall and Justin Sayers. It was co-written by the ex-Dungeon bass guitarist Brendon McDonald.

Track listing

Personnel
 Musical
Lord
 Lord Tim – vocals, guitars, keyboards, bass guitar
 Tim Yatras – drums, keyboards, backing vocals
 Andrew Dowling – bass guitar, backing vocals
 Mark Furtner - guitar, keyboards, backing vocals

with
 Tania Moran – backing vocals
 Chris Brooks – guitar (on 10)
 Craig Goldy - guitar (on 10)
 Glen Drover - guitar (on 10)
 Pete Lesperance - guitar (on 11)
 Olof Mörck - guitar (on 10)
 Stu Marshall - guitar (on 10)
 Felipe Andreoli - bass guitar (on 10)
 Chris Porcianko - guitar (on 10)
 Justin Sayers - bass guitar (on 10)
 Richie Hausberger - guitar (on 10)
 Yoshiyasu Maruyama - guitar (on 10)

 Technical
 Produced and mixed by Lord Tim at SLS Studios, Wollongong

 Graphical
 Cover art - Felipe Machado Franco
 Booklet design and layout - Lord Tim
 Photography - Vesna Trokter

Lord (band) albums
2009 albums